The H4A was a modified version of Honda's first 4-speed automatic transmission, the H4.  Introduced in 1990 on the flagship Honda Accord, the H4A series had three shafts, rather than the two found on the H4.  It was replaced by the light-duty M6HA series and medium-duty B7XA.

Applications:
 1990– Honda Accord (PX4B)
 1991–1992 Honda Accord (APX4)
 1991– Honda Accord (MPXA)
 1992– Honda Accord (MPWA)
 1992–1994 Acura Vigor (MPWA)
 1993– Honda Accord (MPXA)
 1994–1997 Honda Accord (MPOA)

See also
 List of Honda transmissions

H4A
Automatic transmission tradenames